Červenka (feminine Červenková) is a Czech surname, it may refer to:
Bronislav Červenka (born 1975), Czech footballer
Dominika Červenková (born 1988), Czech rhythmic gymnast
Exene Cervenka (born 1956), American musician
Karel Červenka (born 1900), Czech cyclist
Marek Červenka (born 1991), Czech footballer
Markéta Červenková (born 1991), Czech athlete
Martin Červenka (born 1992), Czech baseball player
Roman Červenka (born 1985), Czech ice hockey player

See also

Czerwenka, a surname

Czech-language surnames